Ischiocentra diringshofeni is a species of beetle in the family Cerambycidae. It was described by Lane in 1956. It is known from Brazil.

References

Onciderini
Beetles described in 1956